Jorge Armando Ruiz Fajardo (born May 17, 1989 in Barbosa) is a Colombian racewalker. He placed 17th in the men's 50 kilometres walk at the 2016 Summer Olympics. In 2021, he represented Colombia at the 2020 Summer Olympics, finishing 13th in the men's 50 kilometres walk.

References

1989 births
Living people
Colombian male racewalkers
Olympic athletes of Colombia
Athletes (track and field) at the 2016 Summer Olympics
Athletes (track and field) at the 2019 Pan American Games
Pan American Games competitors for Colombia
Central American and Caribbean Games medalists in athletics
Athletes (track and field) at the 2020 Summer Olympics
Sportspeople from Santander Department
21st-century Colombian people